
Lugano is a city in Switzerland.

Lugano may also refer to:

People 
Charles Lugano, a Kenyan politician
Diego Lugano, a Uruguayan footballer

Places 
Canton of Lugano, a canton of the Helvetic Republic from 1798 to 1803, with its capital at Lugano
Lake Lugano, a glacial lake in the south-east of Switzerland
Lugano District, a district of Canton Ticino, Switzerland 
Mount Lugano, a mountain in Greenland
Villa Lugano, a neighbourhood in Buenos Aires, Argentina
Lugarno, a suburb in southern Sydney, Australia

Religion 
Lugano Cathedral, a Roman Catholic church in Lugano, Switzerland
Roman Catholic Diocese of Lugano, in Switzerland

Sports 
BSI Challenger Lugano, a professional tennis tournament played on outdoor red clay courts
Club Atlético Lugano, an Argentine football club, from Tapiales neighborhood in La Matanza Partido, Buenos Aires Province
FC Lugano, a Swiss football club based in Lugano
Gran Premio di Lugano, a road bicycle race held annually in Lugano, Switzerland
HC Lugano, a professional ice hockey club based in Lugano
Lugano Tigers, a Swiss professional basketball club that is based in Lugano

Transport 
Lugano Airport, on west of Lugano, Switzerland
Lugano railway station, a station owned and operated by the Swiss Federal Railways, in the city of Lugano

Other 
1936 Lugano, asteroid
University of Lugano, a public university located in Lugano, Switzerland

See also
Lucano (disambiguation)